Anki may refer to:
 Anki (software), spaced repetition software
 Anki (company), a now-defunct American robotics and artificial intelligence startup 
 Anki (Finnish company), a manufacturer of rugs
 Anxi County (Anki), Quanzhou, Fujian, People's Republic of China